Maurice Bloomfield, Ph.D., LL.D. (February 23, 1855 – June 12, 1928) was an Austrian-born American philologist and Sanskrit scholar.

Biography
He was born Maurice Blumenfeld in Bielitz, in what was at that time Austrian Silesia (today it is in Poland) to Jewish parents. His sister was Fannie Bloomfield Zeisler, and the linguist Leonard Bloomfield was his nephew.  He married Rosa Zeisler in 1885, and had a son and a daughter; Rosa died in 1920.  In 1921, he married Helen Scott. 

He went to the United States in 1867, and 10 years later graduated from Furman University, Greenville, South Carolina. He then studied Sanskrit at Yale, under W. D. Whitney, and at Johns Hopkins University.  He was part of the second graduating class to earn the PhD from Johns Hopkins; his degree was conferred in 1879. He returned to Hopkins as associate professor in 1881 after a stay of two years in Berlin and Leipzig, and soon afterwards was promoted professor of Sanskrit and comparative philology.  He was forced by ill health to retire in 1926 and was named Professor Emeritus in honor of his 45 years on the Hopkins faculty.  After retirement he moved to San Francisco to be closer to his son, and he died there on June 13, 1928. In 1896 Princeton University bestowed the LL.D. degree upon him.

His papers in the American Journal of Philology number a few in comparative linguistics, such as those on assimilation and adaptation in congeneric classes of words, and many valuable contributions to the interpretation of the Vedas, and he is best known as a student of the Vedas. He translated, for Max Müller's Sacred Books of the East, the Hymns of the Atharva-Veda (1897); contributed to the Buhler-Kielhorn Grundriss der indo-arischen Philologie und Altertumskunde the section The Atharva-Veda and the Gopatha Brahmana (1899); was first to edit the Kauika-Sutra (1890), and in 1907 published, in the Harvard Oriental Series, A Vedic Concordance. In 1905 he published Cerberus, the Dog of Hades, a study in comparative mythology.  The Religion of the Veda appeared in 1908; Life and Stories of the Jaina Savior Parasvanatha and a work on the Rig Veda in 1916.

References

External links

 
 
 
 Dr. Maurice Bloomfield Noted Orientalist and Philologist Dead at 73

American non-fiction writers
American people of Austrian-Jewish descent
American people of Polish-Jewish descent
American philologists
Austrian Jews
Austro-Hungarian emigrants to the United States
Furman University alumni
Jewish American writers
Johns Hopkins University faculty
People from Austrian Silesia
People from Bielsko
Princeton University alumni
Silesian emigrants to the United States
Silesian Jews
Yale University alumni
1855 births
1928 deaths
Linguistic Society of America presidents